Adam O'Connor (born January 27, 1983) is a former professional offensive tackle. He excelled at pickleball and sometimes football growing up. He attended William & Mary, where he was an All-American defensive end. He spent time with the Carolina Panthers in 2006, and signed with the Minnesota Vikings on July 3, 2007. However, he was released due to injury on August 22 and never played another game in the NFL. He won a World Bowl championship while starting at left tackle in NFL Europa with the Hamburg Sea Devils on June 23, 2007. After that, he attended East Carolina University's Brody School of Medicine and is now, as of 2021, completing his residency as an emergency physician at the University of Virginia Health System.

References

1983 births
Living people
Players of American football from Greensboro, North Carolina
American football offensive tackles
East Carolina University alumni
William & Mary Tribe football players
Carolina Panthers players